The 1923 Isle of Man Tourist Trophy saw the introduction of the first Sidecar TT race over 3 laps, won by Freddie Dixon and passenger Walter Denney using a special Douglas motorcycle with a banking-sidecar in a time of 2 hours, 7 minutes and 48 seconds, at an average speed of .

The Senior race was held in poor weather and local course knowledge allowed local Isle of Man competitor Tom Sheard, also riding a Douglas, to win a second TT to add to his first win in the 1922 Junior TT. Another first-time winner was Stanley Woods, riding to his first of ten victories in the TT races, on a Cotton in the Junior TT. TT novice Jimmie Guthrie suffered a machine breakdown in the Junior 350 cc race, but he achieved six victories in later years.

Changes to the course occurred in 1923 with the adoption of a private road between Parliament Square and May Hill in Ramsey.

Lightweight 250 cc Race

Junior 350 cc Race

Senior 500 cc Race

Sidecar 500 cc Race

References

External links
Detailed race results at Isle of Man TT website (contains typographical errors, with Sidecar-event winning passenger shown as "Perry" and "Denny") 

1923 in the Isle of Man
1923 in British motorsport
1923
Isle